The 1999 Women's World Chess Championship was won by former champion Xie Jun, who regained her title after defeating Alisa Galliamova. Previous to the match, reigning champion Susan Polgar had been stripped of her title after much controversy.

1995 Interzonal Tournament
As part of the qualification process, an Interzonal tournament was held in Chişinău in 1995, featuring the best players from each FIDE zone. 52 players took part with the top seven qualifying for the Candidates Tournament. For the third time, the Interzonal was played as a 13-round Swiss system tournament.

{| class="wikitable"
|+ 1995 Women's Interzonal Tournament
|-
! !! Player !! 1 !! 2 !! 3 !! 4 !! 5 !! 6 !! 7 !! 8 !! 9 !! 10 !! 11 !! 12 !! 13 !! Points !! Tie break
|- style="background:#ccffcc;"
| 1 ||  || +36 || +44 || +11 || =2 || +4 || +8 || -3 || +9 || =7 || =6 || +10 || -5 || +19 || 9½ || 
|- style="background:#ccffcc;"
| 2 ||  || +45 || +43 || +20 || =1 || +19 || +4 || =6 || =11 || =3 || =10 || =5 || =7 || =8 || 9 || 
|- style="background:#ccffcc;"
| 3 ||  || +33 || =17 || =8 || +32 || =7 || =12 || +1 || +20 || =2 || =9 || =4 || =11 || =5 || 8½ || 64.50
|- style="background:#ccffcc;"
| 4 ||  || +16 || +31 || =19 || +5 || -1 || -2 || =26 || +18 || +11 || =17 || =3 || =9 || +7 || 8½ || 63.50
|- style="background:#ccffcc;"
| 5 ||  || =15 || +42 || +39 || -4 || -17 || +18 || =25 || +27 || +21 || =7 || =2 || +1 || =3 || 8½ || 60.75
|- style="background:#ccffcc;"
| 6 ||  || =38 || =26 || +47 || =29 || =18 || +19 || =2 || =8 || +12 || =1 || -7 || +20 || +11 || 8½ || 60.25
|- style="background:#ccffcc;"
| 7 ||  || +27 || =39 || =18 || +25 || =3 || =9 || =8 || +17 || =1 || =5 || +6 || =2 || -4 || 8 || 60.50
|-
| 8 ||  || +24 || +9 || =3 || =19 || +20 || -1 || =7 || =6 || -10 || +23 || =17 || +21 || =2 || 8 || 60.00
|-
| 9 ||  || +13 || -8 || +40 || =17 || +33 || =7 || +12 || -1 || +20 || =3 || =11 || =4 || =15 || 8 || 57.00
|-
| 10 ||  || =34 || -18 || +42 || =23 || =25 || =13 || +38 || +29 || +8 || =2 || -1 || =15 || =20 || 7½ || 51.25
|-
| 11 ||  || +23 || +47 || -1 || =18 || =29 || +38 || +27 || =2 || -4 || +31 || =9 || =3 || -6 || 7½ || 50.50
|-
| 12 ||  || +37 || =25 || =17 || =33 || +36 || =3 || -9 || +23 || -6 || +39 || -21 || =14 || +30 || 7½ || 48.75
|-
| 13 ||  || -9 || -24 || +15 || +31 || =22 || =10 || -28 || =14 || =27 || +44 || =32 || +41 || +33 || 7½ || 47.75
|-
| 14 ||  || -39 || =27 || -37 || =46 || +50 || =49 || =45 || =13 || +42 || =28 || +25 || =12 || +29 || 7½ || 44.25
|-
| 15 ||  || =5 || -32 || -13 || -45 || +51 || +37 || =36 || +49 || +33 || =26 || +31 || =10 || =9 || 7½ || 44.25
|-
| 16 ||  || -4 || =35 || -27 || +51 || =43 || -28 || +50 || =34 || +45 || -19 || +23 || +37 || +26 || 7½ || 40.50
|-
| 17 ||  || +41 || =3 || =12 || =9 || +5 || =27 || =21 || -7 || +28 || =4 || =8 || -19 || =18 || 7 || 51.00
|-
| 18 ||  || =28 || +10 || =7 || =11 || =6 || -5 || +32 || -4 || +30 || =20 || =19 || =31 || =17 || 7 || 49.00
|-
| 19 ||  || +49 || +30 || =4 || =8 || -2 || -6 || -23 || +44 || =22 || +16 || =18 || +17 || -1 || 7 || 45.75
|-
| 20 ||  || +48 || +22 || -2 || +34 || -8 || +26 || +29 || -3 || -9 || =18 || +41 || -6 || =10 || 7 || 43.75
|-
| 21 ||  || -25 || =37 || +43 || =49 || =40 || +36 || =17 || +30 || -5 || =29 || +12 || -8 || =22 || 7 || 43.25
|-
| 22 ||  || +46 || -20 || =49 || =40 || =13 || =23 || =30 || =33 || =19 || =25 || +39 || =29 || =21 || 7 || 42.50
|-
| 23 ||  || -11 || +52 || +28 || =10 || -26 || =22 || +19 || -12 || +38 || -8 || -16 || +39 || +32 || 7 || 38.75
|-
| 24 ||  || -8 || +13 || =30 || -36 || -45 || =42 || +43 || -32 || =46 || =47 || +52 || +38 || +34 || 7 || 36.00
|-
| 25 ||  || +21 || =12 || =32 || -7 || =10 || +33 || =5 || =28 || -26 || =22 || -14 || +27 || =31 || 6½ || 44.25
|-
| 26 ||  || =40 || =6 || =36 || +37 || +23 || -20 || =4 || -39 || +25 || =15 || =29 || =30 || -16 || 6½ || 44.00
|-
| 27 ||  || -7 || =14 || +16 || +30 || +28 || =17 || -11 || -5 || =13 || =32 || =33 || -25 || +41 || 6½ || 43.00
|-
| 28 ||  || =18 || =34 || -23 || +48 || -27 || +16 || +13 || =25 || -17 || =14 || -30 || =35 || +40 || 6½ || 42.00
|-
| 29 ||  || -43 || +45 || +46 || =6 || =11 || +32 || -20 || -10 || +40 || =21 || =26 || =22 || -14 || 6½ || 39.75
|-
| 30 ||  || +51 || -19 || =24 || -27 || +35 || +41 || =22 || -21 || -18 || +34 || +28 || =26 || -12 || 6½ || 37.25
|-
| 31 ||  || +35 || -4 || -33 || -13 || +48 || =40 || +49 || +45 || +39 || -11 || -15 || =18 || =25 || 6½ || 25.50
|-
| 32 ||  || =42 || +15 || =25 || -3 || +34 || -29 || -18 || +24 || =41 || =27 || =13 || =33 || -23 || 6 || 39.25
|-
| 33 ||  || -3 || +41 || +31 || =12 || -9 || -25 || +35 || =22 || -15 || +40 || =27 || =32 || -13 || 6 || 37.00
|-
| 34 ||  || =10 || =28 || +44 || -20 || -32 || +46 || -39 || =16 || =35 || -30 || +45 || +42 || -24 || 6 || 34.25
|-
| 35 || || -31 || =16 || -38 || +42 || -30 || +43 || -33 || =46 || =34 || =45 || +47 || =28 || =37 || 6 || 33.50
|-
| 36 ||  || -1 || +50 || =26 || +24 || -12 || -21 || =15 || -38 || -43 || +51 || =44 || =49 || +45 || 6 || 31.25
|-
| 37 ||  || -12 || =21 || +14 || -26 || -41 || -15 || +52 || +47 || =44 || =38 || +46 || -16 || =35 || 6 || 30.00
|-
| 38 ||  || =6 || -40 || +35 || =39 || +49 || -11 || -10 || +36 || -23 || =37 || =42 || -24 || +52 || 6 || 29.75
|-
| 39 ||  || +14 || =7 || -5 || =38 || -44 || +47 || +34 || +26 || -31 || -12 || -22 || -23 || =48 || 5½ || 34.50
|-
| 40 ||  || =26 || +38 || -9 || =22 || =21 || =31 || =44 || =41 || -29 || -33 || =50 || +46 || -28 || 5½ || 32.00
|-
| 41 ||  || -17 || -33 || +52 || =44 || +37 || -30 || +48 || =40 || =32 || +43 || -20 || -13 || -27 || 5½ || 24.75
|-
| 42 ||  || =32 || -5 || -10 || -35 || +52 || =24 || =47 || +50 || -14 || +48 || =38 || -34 || =51 || 5½ || 23.50
|-
| 43 ||  || +29 || -2 || -21 || =47 || =16 || -35 || -24 || +48 || +36 || -41 || =51 || -50 || =49 || 5 || 27.50
|-
| 44 ||  || +50 || -1 || -34 || =41 || +39 || =45 || =40 || -19 || =37 || -13 || =36 || =48 || – || 5 || 26.50
|-
| 45 ||  || -2 || -29 || =51 || +15 || +24 || =44 || =14 || -31 || -16 || =35 || -34 || +52 || -36 || 5 || 25.75
|-
| 46 ||  || -22 || +48 || -29 || =14 || =47 || -34 || =51 || =35 || =24 || +52 || -37 || -40 || =50 || 5 || 22.00
|-
| 47 ||  || +52 || -11 || -6 || =43 || =46 || -39 || =42 || -37 || +50 || =24 || -35 || +51 || – || 5 || 19.25
|-
| 48 ||  || -20 || -46 || +50 || -28 || -31 || +52 || -41 || -43 || +51 || -42 || +49 || =44 || =39 || 5 || 17.75
|-
| 49 ||  || -19 || +51 || =22 || =21 || -38 || =14 || -31 || -15 || =52 || =50 || -48 || =36 || =43 || 4½ || 21.75
|-
| 50 ||  || -44 || -36 || -48 || +52 || -14 || +51 || -16 || -42 || -47 || =49 || =40 || +43 || =46 || 4½ || 16.00
|-
| 51 ||  || -30 || -49 || =45 || -16 || -15 || -50 || =46 || +52 || -48 || -36 || =43 || -47 || =42 || 3 || 
|-
| 52 ||  || -47 || -23 || -41 || -50 || -42 || -48 || -37 || -51 || =49 || -46 || -24 || -45 || -38 || ½ || 
|}

The last round game between Radu and Lematschko wasn't played.

1997 Candidates Tournament
The seven qualifiers from the Interzonal Tournament were joined by the loser of the last championship match, Xie Jun, as well as the two runners-up from the previous tournament, Chiburdanidze and Cramling. These ten players contested a double round-robin tournament in Groningen in December 1997, from which the top two would advance to the final to determine the challenger.

Galliamova and Xie Jun finished first and second. FIDE decided that the whole final match should be played in Shenyang, China, after Chinese sponsors made the best offer for the prize fund. However, Galliamova refused to play entirely on her opponent's home turf, so Xie Jun was declared the winner by default and given the right to challenge champion Polgar.

{| class="wikitable"
|+ 1997 Women's Candidates Tournament
|-
! !! Player !! Rating !! 1 !! 2 !! 3 !! 4 !! 5 !! 6 !! 7 !! 8 !! 9 !! 10 !! Points
|- style="background:#ccffcc;"
| 1 ||  || 2445 || - || ½ || 1 || 1½ || 2 || 1½ || 1½ || 1½ || 2 || 2 || 13½ 
|- style="background:#ccffcc;"
| 2 ||  || 2495 || 1½ || - || 1½ || ½ || ½ || 1½ || 2 || 1 || 2 || 2 || 12½ 
|-
| 3 ||  || 2520 || 1 || ½ || - || 1 || 1½ || 1½ || ½ || 1 || 2 || 2 || 11 
|-
| 4 ||  || 2525 || ½ || 1½ || 1 || - || 1 || 1½ || ½ || 1 || 2 || 2 || 11 
|-
| 5 ||  || 2400 || 0 || 1½ || ½ || 1 || - || ½ || 1½ || 1 || 1½ || 1½ || 9 
|-
| 6 ||  || 2460 || ½ || ½ || ½ || ½ || 1½ || - || 1 || 1½ || 1½ || 1½ || 9 
|-
| 7 ||  || 2430 || ½ || 0 || 1½ || 1½ || ½ || 1 || - || 0 || 2 || 2 || 9 
|-
| 8 ||  || 2520 || ½ || 1 || 1 || 1 || 1 || ½ || 2 || - || 0 || 1½ || 8½ 
|-
| 9 ||  || 2370 || 0 || 0 || 0 || 0 || ½ || ½ || 0 || 2 || - || 2 || 5 
|-
| 10 ||  || 2415 || 0 || 0 || 0 || 0 || ½ || ½ || 0 || ½ || 0 || - || 1½ 
|}

Kachiani-Gersinska withdrew after 10 rounds.

1999 Championship Match
The championship match was at first scheduled to take place in November 1998, but champion Susan Polgar requested a postponement because she was pregnant. FIDE had been unable to find a satisfactory sponsor, so the request was granted. By the time FIDE announced the new date and venue for the title match to be played China in 1999, Polgar had given birth to her son Tom—however, she still considered that the time to recover from childbirth and prepare for the new match was insufficient. In addition, like Galliamova, she didn't want to play entirely in the opponent's home country. She also wanted a significantly larger prize fund, so she requested that the match be postponed again. This time FIDE refused and negotiations broke down.

Instead FIDE ruled that Polgar had forfeited the title and arranged a new title match between the two Candidates finalists, Xie Jun and Galliamova. The match was played in Kazan, Tatarstan, and Shenyang, China, in 1999. Xie Jun won by two points and regained the title that she had lost to Polgar three years previously.

{| class="wikitable" style="text-align:center"
|+Women's World Championship Match 1999
|-
! !! 1 !! 2 !! 3 !! 4 !! 5 !! 6 !! 7 !! 8 !! 9 !! 10 !! 11 !! 12 !! 13 !! 14 !! 15 !! Total
|-
| align=left | 
| ½ ||style="background:black; color:white"| 0 || 1 ||style="background:black; color:white"| ½ || 0 ||style="background:black; color:white"| 1 || ½ ||style="background:black; color:white"| ½ || 0 ||style="background:black; color:white"| ½ || 0 ||style="background:black; color:white"| 1 || ½ ||style="background:black; color:white"| 0 || ½ || 6½
|-
| align=left | 
|style="background:black; color:white"| ½ || 1 ||style="background:black; color:white"| 0 || ½ ||style="background:black; color:white"| 1 || 0 ||style="background:black; color:white"| ½ || ½ ||style="background:black; color:white"| 1 || ½ ||style="background:black; color:white"| 1 || 0 ||style="background:black; color:white"| ½ || 1 ||style="background:black; color:white"| ½ || 8½
|}

References

Women's World Chess Championships
1999 in chess